The White Mountains Wilderness is a wilderness area in the White Mountains of California, United States. The wilderness is largely managed by the Inyo National Forest, with  managed by the Bureau of Land Management.

The wilderness covers the White Mountains along the eastern boundary of California, from Boundary Peak in the north, south almost to Bishop. The wilderness includes White Mountain Peak, but excludes the roads to the south of the peak.

Signs placed at the entrance of the wilderness near the trail to White Mountain Peak were initially misspelled "White Mountain Wilderness", the name of another wilderness area in New Mexico.

References

Wilderness areas of California
Inyo National Forest
Protected areas established in 2009
2009 establishments in California
Protected areas of Inyo County, California
Protected areas of Mono County, California